Greg McDermott (born November 25, 1964) is an American basketball coach who has been the head coach of the Creighton Bluejays men's basketball team since 2010. Previously, McDermott served as the head coach at Wayne State College, North Dakota State, Northern Iowa, and Iowa State. He is the father of NBA player Doug McDermott.

Early life
McDermott grew up in Cascade, Iowa, and played basketball for Cascade High School. A 6'8" center, he then played college basketball for the Northern Iowa Panthers from 1984 to 1988. In 1988, he earned a B.A. degree from Northern Iowa. He is the father of current NBA player Doug McDermott.

Coaching career

Early coaching career
McDermott began his coaching career as an assistant coach at North Dakota between 1989 and 1994, and during his tenure helped lead the Fighting Sioux to five consecutive NCAA Division II tournaments. On March 29, 1994, he accepted his first head coaching position at Division II Wayne State College. McDermott remained as the head coach at Wayne State College for six seasons and compiled an overall record of 116 wins and 53 losses (116–53) during his tenure there from 1994 to 2000.

North Dakota State
In April 2000, McDermott resigned his Wayne State post and accepted the head coaching position at North Dakota State. In his lone season with State, he led the Bison to an overall record of 15 wins and 11 losses (15–11) en route to an eighth place finish in the North Central Conference.

Northern Iowa
On April 3, 2001, McDermott was introduced as head coach at his alma mater, Northern Iowa.

McDermott remained as the Panthers' head coach for five seasons between 2001 and 2006. During his tenure he led Northern Iowa to an overall record of 90 wins and 63 losses (90–63), the 2004 Missouri Valley Conference tournament championship and the 2004, 2005, and 2006 NCAA Tournaments.

Iowa State

McDermott resigned his position with Northern Iowa on March 21, 2006, and accepted the same one at Iowa State. McDermott was the Cyclones' head coach for four seasons between 2007 and 2010, and during his tenure led them to an overall record of 59 wins and 68 losses (59–68). His marquee victory at Iowa State came on March 6, 2010, against No. 5 Kansas State. This was his only victory over a ranked team while with the Cyclones.

Creighton
On April 26, 2010, he resigned from Iowa State and accepted the same position at Creighton. The contract with Creighton was a reported ten-year deal, worth well over one million dollars per season.

2010–11 season
In his first season with the Bluejays, McDermott led the team to a 23–16 record, 10–8 in the Missouri Valley Conference. Creighton reached the final round of the College Basketball Invitational tournament where they lost to Oregon two games to one.

2011–12 season
In just his second year, McDermott led Creighton to the Missouri Valley Conference tournament championship. The Bluejays were ranked as high as No. 12 in the nation, finished sixth nationally in home attendance, and received an automatic bid to the NCAA Tournament as the No. 8 seed in the Midwest Region. Creighton would defeat Alabama 58–57 in the first round, and lose to UNC 87–73 in the second round.

2012–13 season
Entering the 2012–13 season, McDermott had Creighton in the rankings in both preseason polls; they were No. 15 in the USA Today Coaches Poll and No. 16 in the AP Poll. McDermott would lead Creighton to the MVC regular season championship, and its second straight MVC conference tournament championship. The Bluejays were ranked as high as No. 10 in the nation and finished sixth nationally in home attendance for the second consecutive year. The Bluejays received an automatic bid to the NCAA Tournament, where they were the No. 7 seed in the Midwest Region. Creighton would defeat Cincinnati 67–63 in the first round, and lose to Duke 66–50 in the second round.

2013–14 season
After the end of the 2012–13 season, Creighton left the Missouri Valley to join the Big East. In his fourth year at Creighton and first in the Big East, McDermott would lead Creighton to a runner-up finish in the Big East regular season and tournament. The Bluejays were ranked as high as No. 9 in the nation, and finished sixth nationally in home attendance for the third consecutive year. The Bluejays lost to Providence 65–58 in the finals of the Big East tournament, and received an at-large bid to the NCAA Tournament as the No. 3 seed in the West Region, the highest NCAA Tournament seed in Creighton history. Creighton would defeat UL Lafayette 76–66 in the first round, and lose to Baylor 85–55 in the second round.

2014–15 season
Despite being ranked as high as No. 23 during the season, McDermott would have his first losing season at Creighton as they finished in a tie for last place in the Big East with a record of 14–19, 4–14 in conference play.

2015–16 season
In his sixth season with Creighton, McDermott led the Bluejays to a sixth place finish in the Big East with a record of 18–13, 9–9 in conference play. In the quarterfinals of the NIT, they lost to BYU 88–82 to finish the season 20–15.

2016–17 season
Entering the 2016–17 season, Creighton was ranked in both preseason polls. McDermott led the Bluejays to an 18–1 start and a ranking as high as No. 7 in the nation. The team finished the regular season 23–8, and lost to Villanova in the Big East tournament finals. The Bluejays received an at-large bid to the NCAA tournament as the No. 6 seed in the Midwest Region, and lost to the Rhode Island Rams 84–72 in the first round to finish the season 25–10.

2017–18 season
McDermott led the 2017–2018 Bluejays to a 21–12 record, 10–8 in Big East play to finish in a three-way tie for third place. They lost in the quarterfinals of the Big East tournament to Providence 72–68. They received an at-large bid to the NCAA tournament as the No. 8 seed in the South Region. There, the Bluejays lost in the first round to Kansas State 69–59.

2018–19 season
The Bluejays finished the season 20–15, 9–9 in Big East play to finish in a four-way tie for third place. As the No. 5 seed in the Big East tournament, they lost to Xavier in the quarterfinals. They received a bid to the National Invitation Tournament as the No. 2 seed in the NIT bracket where they defeated Loyola and Memphis before losing to TCU 71–58 in the quarterfinals.

2019–20 season
Entering the 2019–20 season, the Bluejays were picked to finish 7th in the Big East, however McDermott and his team were able to finish tied for the Big East regular season championship with Villanova and Seton Hall. The Bluejays received the number 1 seed in the Big East tournament, and finished with a 24–7 record, 13–5 in the Big East.  The Jays finished with a ranking of 7th in the nation which was their highest ranking of the season.  Due to the COVID-19 outbreak, both the Big East tournament and the NCAA Tournament were cancelled. McDermott would record his 500th win as a head coach in this season with a 77–65 win over Xavier.

2020–21 season

On Thursday, February 27, 2021, McDermott used an "insensitive and racist" analogy ("Guys, we need to stick together....We need both feet in. I need everybody to stay on the plantation. I can't have anybody leave the plantation.") while speaking to his team in the locker room after a 77–69 loss to the Xavier Musketeers. McDermott apologized for his actions, and was suspended by the university from all team activities for four days. Assistant coach Alan Huss served as interim head coach and coached the Bluejays to a 93–73 win over the Butler Bulldogs on March 6. McDermott was reinstated on March 8, 2021. Creighton finished the 2020–21 regular season with an 18–7 record, 14–6 in conference play, to finish in second place in the Big East. Creighton received an at-large bid to the NCAA tournament as the No. 5 seed in the West Region. In the first round, the Bluejays defeated the UCSB Gauchos 63–62. In the second round, the Bluejays defeated the Ohio Bobcats 72–58, to reach the program's first regional semifinal since 1974. Creighton was defeated by Gonzaga 83–65, to finish the season with a record of 22–9.

2021–22 season
During the 2021–22 regular season, largely regarded as a rebuilding year after the departure of star point guard Marcus Zegarowski and three other starters from the 2020–2021 roster, as well as two assistant coaches, McDermott nevertheless guided the Bluejays to a 20–10 regular season record (12–7 in Big East play), good enough for 4th place. Creighton received an at-large bid to the NCAA tournament as the No. 9 seed in the Midwest Region. In the first round, the Bluejays defeated the San Diego State Aztecs 72–69 in overtime. In the second round, the Bluejays lost to the Kansas Jayhawks 79–72, to finish the season with a record of 23–12. On March 22, 2022, McDermott received a "multi-year" contract extension. The terms of the deal were not disclosed.

Head coaching record

References

External links
 Creighton profile
 Iowa State profile

1964 births
Living people
American men's basketball coaches
American men's basketball players
Basketball coaches from Iowa
Basketball players from Iowa
Centers (basketball)
College men's basketball head coaches in the United States
Creighton Bluejays men's basketball coaches
Iowa State Cyclones men's basketball coaches
North Dakota Fighting Hawks men's basketball coaches
North Dakota State Bison men's basketball coaches
Northern Iowa Panthers men's basketball coaches
Northern Iowa Panthers men's basketball players
People from Cascade, Iowa
United States Sports Academy alumni
Wayne State Wildcats men's basketball coaches